This is a list of Americans of Irish descent, including both original immigrants who obtained American citizenship and their American-born descendants.

To be included in this list, the person must have a Wikipedia article and/or references showing the person is Irish American.

List

Actors

Arts
Jean Butler – dancer; mother is from County Mayo
Kurt Cobain – songwriter and musician, lead singer of Nirvana
Auliʻi Cravalho – singer and actress
Colleen Doran – cartoonist, illustrator, writer
Michael Flatley – dancer, musician, businessman,
William Harnett – painter, Irish immigrant best known for trompe-l'œil renderings of still life
Carrie Ann Inaba – dancer, actress; mother of Chinese and Irish descent
Gene Kelly – dancer, actor, singer, director, choreographer
Nancy Jewel McDonie – singer, dancer, member of the South Korean group Momoland; mother is Korean and father is of Irish ancestry
Dorothy Miner – art historian and curator
Georgia O'Keeffe – painter; of Irish and Hungarian ancestry
Eileen O'Meara – animator, artist; of Irish and Italian ancestry
Augustus Saint-Gaudens – sculptor; Irish mother

Astronauts
Neil Armstrong – first man on the moon
Eileen Collins – commander for STS-93 and STS-114; pilot for STS-63 and STS-84
Michael Collins – Command Module Pilot for Apollo 11, 1969
James Irwin – Lunar Module Pilot for Apollo 15
Mark Kelly – commander for STS-124 and STS-134; pilot for STS-121 and STS-108
Scott Kelly – NASA astronaut; he and his brother Mark are the only twins and the only siblings who have both traveled in space

Business
Diamond Jim Brady – financier and philanthropist
 Edward Creighton – Omaha businessman and philanthropist
 John A. Creighton (1831–1907) – Omaha businessman and philanthropist 
 Marcus Daly (1841–1900) – A "Copper King" of Butte, Montana, United States
Henry Ford – founder of Ford Motor Company; Anglo-Irish
Paul Galvin – inventor of the car radio; founder of Motorola
Franklin B. Gowen – lawyer; president of the Philadelphia and Reading Railroad; prosecuted the trial against the Molly Maguires
 William Russell Grace (1832–1904) – mayor of New York City and founder of W. R. Grace and Company
Herb Kelleher – Southwest Airlines chairman
Joseph P. Kennedy Sr – SEC Chairman, US Ambassador to the UK, bootlegger
John Leahy – COO of Airbus; commercial pilot
Richard and Maurice McDonald – founders of McDonald's
Tom Monaghan – founder of Domino's Pizza
Bill Rancic – entrepreneur
 Vinny Smith – software executive, billionaire, and philanthropist
Jack Welch – former CEO of GE
Edmund McIlhenny Inventor of hot sauce.

Film directors and producers
Roy E. Disney (1930–2009) – senior executive for The Walt Disney Company; son of Roy O. Disney
Roy O. Disney – Walt Disney's brother
Walt Disney
Thom Fitzgerald – known for independent films including The Hanging Garden; grandparents were immigrants from County Kerry and County Cavan
John Ford – best known for stylish Westerns and The Quiet Man
Alfred Hitchcock – mother of Irish descent
John Huston – became an Irish citizen in 1964; father of Irish descent
Leo McCarey – Irish father
Michael Moore
John Sayles (1950– ) – independent film director and writer, frequently takes a small part in his own and other indie films; both parents are half Irish

Gangsters and mobsters

Journalists, news producers, talk show hosts

Mike Barnicle
Nellie Bly
Jimmy Breslin
William F. Buckley, Jr. (1925–2008)
Howie Carr 
Ann Coulter
John Devoy (1842–1928) – editor of the Gaelic American 1903–1928
Phil Donahue
Maureen Dowd
Roger Ebert
Jimmy Fallon
Austin E. Ford (1857–1896) – editor of the New York Freeman 
Patrick Ford (1837–1913) – founded the Irish World in New York
Pete Hamill
Sean Hannity
Magee Hickey
Greg Kelly
Mary McGrory – Washington political reporter and columnist
James McMaster (1820–1886) – editor of Freeman's Journal (New York) 
Chris Matthews
John Mitchel (1815–1875) – editor of leading Confederate newspaper
Peggy Noonan (1950– ) – author, political analyst and columnist
Conan O'Brien
Soledad O'Brien – journalist and producer
Norah O'Donnell
John Boyle O'Reilly (1844–1890) – editor of Boston Pilot
Bill O'Reilly
John L. O'Sullivan
Dennis Roddy
Tim Russert (1950–2008) – hosted NBC's Meet the Press 1991–2008
Mark Shields (1937–2022)
Ed Sullivan
Elizabeth Vargas – ABC News anchor
Brian Williams – NBC News anchor
Ellen DeGeneres – talk show host

Law enforcement
 John O. Brennan –  Director of the CIA
 Raymond W. Kelly – former New York Police Commissioner
 Francis O'Neill – Chicago Police Chief
 Bernard Kerik former NYPD  commissioner  (Irish mother)
Bat Masterson

Law
 William J. Brennan, Jr. – Associate Justice of the Supreme Court of the United States
 Wayne M. Collins – civil rights attorney
 James B. Comey - former United States Deputy Attorney General
 Charles Patrick Daly - Chief Justice New York Court of Common Pleas
 Patrick Fitzgerald – United States Attorney for the Northern District of Illinois
 Anthony Kennedy – Associate Justice of the Supreme Court of the United States
 Frank Murphy – Associate Justice of the Supreme Court of the United States
 Roger I. McDonough – Chief Justice of the Utah Supreme Court
 Dorothy Miner – chief counsel for the New York City Landmarks Preservation Commission
 Roger J. Traynor – Chief Justice of the Supreme Court of California

Literature
Philip Barry – playwright; author of The Philadelphia Story
Ted Berrigan – poet, part of the second generation of the New York School; author of The Sonnets
John Berryman – poet; a founder of the confessional school of poetry
Louise Bogan – poet, translator, and critic; Poet Laureate of the United States 1945–1946
T. Coraghessan Boyle – novelist and short story writer; awarded the 1988 PEN/Faulkner Award for novel World's End
Bill Bryson – travel writer; awarded an honorary OBE for his contribution to literature
 William F. Buckley, Jr. (1925–2008)
John Horne Burns – novelist and travel writer; author of The Gallery
Jim Carroll – author, poet, and punk musician; author of The Basketball Diaries
Neal Cassady – author and poet; the basis for the character Dean Moriarty in Jack Kerouac's novel On the Road
Raymond Chandler – novelist and short story writer; author of the Philip Marlowe detective series that shaped the modern "private eye" story
Mary Coyle Chase – playwright and screenwriter; awarded the 1945 Pulitzer Prize for Drama for Harvey
Kate Chopin – novelist and short story writer; The Awakening (1899) is considered a proto-feminist precursor to American modernism
Tom Clancy – author of many bestselling novels, including The Hunt for Red October and Clear and Present Danger
Mary Higgins Clark – bestselling author of suspense novels
Billy Collins – poet; twice Poet Laureate of the United States, 2001–2003
Joe Connelly – novelist; author of Bringing Out the Dead
Michael Connelly – crime novelist; author of the bestselling Harry Bosch detective series
Pat Conroy – novelist and memoirist; author of The Great Santini and The Prince of Tides
Robert Creeley – poet and author associated with the Black Mountain poets; awarded a 2000 American Book Award Lifetime Achievement Award
Maureen Daly – novelist and short story writer; Seventeenth Summer (1942) is considered the first young adult novel
J.P. Donleavy – novelist; author of The Ginger Man, named on the Modern Library List of Best 20th-Century Novels
Kirby Doyle – poet and novelist; associated with the New American Poetry movement and "third generation" American modernist poets
Alan Dugan – poet; winner of the 1961 Pulitzer Prize for Poetry for his volume Poems
James T. Farrell – novelist; author of the Studs Lonigan trilogy, named on the Modern Library List of Best 20th-Century Novels
F. Scott Fitzgerald – novelist and short story writer; The Great Gatsby was named on both the Modern Library List of Best 20th-Century Novels and the TIME 100 Best English-Language Novels from 1923 to 2005
Robert Fitzgerald – poet, critic, and translator; Poet Laureate of the United States 1984–1985
Thomas Flanagan – novelist and academic; winner of the 1979 National Book Critics Circle Award for The Year of the French
Vince Flynn – political thriller novelist; author of bestselling Mitch Rapp series
Alice Fulton – poet and short story writer; awarded the 2002 Bobbitt National Prize for Poetry for Felt
Tess Gallagher – poet, short story writer, essayist, and playwright
Lucy Grealy – poet, memoirist, and essayist; author of Autobiography of a Face
Pete Hamill – journalist, columnist, novelist, and short story writer
George V. Higgins – novelist, columnist, and academic; known for bestselling crime novels including The Friends of Eddie Coyle
Fanny Howe – poet, novelist, and short-story writer; awarded the 2001 Lenore Marshall Poetry Prize for Selected Poems
Marie Howe – poet; winner of the 1987 Open Competition of the National Poetry Series for The Good Thief
Susan Howe – poet and literary critic; American Book Awards in 1981 for The Liberties and 1986 for My Emily Dickinson
Brigit Pegeen Kelly – poet; finalist for the 2005 Pulitzer Prize for Poetry for The Orchard
Robert Kelly – poet associated with the deep image group; awarded a 1980 American Book Award for In Time
William Kennedy – novelist and author; winner of the 1983 National Book Critics Circle Award for Fiction, 1984 Pulitzer Prize for Fiction for Ironweed, and 1984 American Book Award for O Albany!
X. J. Kennedy – poet, translator, anthologist, editor, and children's author
Richard Kenney – poet and academic
Jean Kerr – author and Tony Award-winning playwright
Galway Kinnell – poet; awarded the 1983 Pulitzer Prize for Poetry and 1983 National Book Award for Poetry for Selected Poems
R. A. Lafferty – Hugo and Nebula-nominated science fiction author
Michael Lally – poet and author; awarded a 2000 American Book Award for It's Not Nostalgia: Poetry and Prose
James Laughlin – poet and publisher; winner of the 1989 National Book Critics Circle Award Lifetime Achievement Award and the 1992 National Book Awards Medal of Distinguished Contribution to American Letters; namesake of the annual James Laughlin Award administered by the Academy of American Poets
Dennis Lehane – novelist, author of A Drink Before the War and Mystic River
John Logan – poet and academic; awarded the 1982 Lenore Marshall Poetry Prize for Only the Dreamer Can Change the Dream
William Logan – poet, critic, and scholar; awarded the 2005 National Book Critics Circle Award for Criticism for The Undiscovered Country: Poetry in the Age of Tin
Thomas Lynch – poet and essayist; awarded a 1998 American Book Award for The Undertaking: Life Studies from the Dismal Trade
Michael Patrick MacDonald – memoirist; winner of a 2000 American Book Award for All Souls: A Family Story From Southie
George R. R. Martin – author of the epic fantasy novel series A Song of Ice and Fire
Cormac McCarthy – novelist and playwright; author of Blood Meridian and winner of the 2007 Pulitzer for The Road
Frank McCourt – memoirist; winner of the 1996 National Book Critics Circle Award and the 1997 Pulitzer Prize for Biography or Autobiography for Angela's Ashes
Alice McDermott – novelist; awarded the 1998 National Book Award and a 1999 American Book Award for Charming Billy
Campbell McGrath – poet
Thomas McGrath – poet; awarded a 1984 American Book Award for Echoes Inside the Labyrinth and the 1989 Lenore Marshall Poetry Prize for Selected Poems: 1938–1988
Thomas McGuane – novelist, screenwriter, and short story writer; nominated for a National Book Award for Ninety-Two in the Shade
Jay McInerney – novelist; author of Bright Lights, Big City
James McMichael – poet; awarded the 1999 Arthur Rense Prize
Terrence McNally – playwright; winner of six Tony Awards and nominated for the 1994 Pulitzer Prize for Drama for A Perfect Ganesh
Maile Meloy – novelist and short story writer; awarded The Paris Review's 2001 Aga Khan Prize for Fiction for her story "Aqua Boulevard"
Margaret Mitchell – novelist; awarded the 1937 Pulitzer Prize for Gone with the Wind
Helen Curtin Moskey – poet
Robert C. O'Brien – journalist and children's author; awarded the 1972 Newbery Medal for Mrs. Frisby and the Rats of NIMH
Tim O'Brien – novelist and short story writer; prominent author of fiction about the Vietnam War, including The Things They Carried, a finalist for both the Pulitzer Prize and the National Book Critics Circle Award
Edwin O'Connor – novelist, winner of the 1962 Pulitzer Prize for Fiction for The Edge of Sadness
Flannery O'Connor – novelist and short story writer; notable author in the Southern Gothic style
Frank O'Hara – poet, prominent member of the New York School
John O'Hara – novelist; author of Appointment in Samarra, named one of the TIME 100 Best English-Language Novels from 1923 to 2005
Charles Olson – poet and critic, associated with the second generation American Modernist poets; author of The Maximus Poems
Eugene O'Neill – playwright; awarded the 1936 Nobel Prize for Literature; four-time winner of the Pulitzer Prize for Drama
J.F. Powers – novelist and short story writer; winner of the 1963 National Book Award for Morte d'Urban
Anne Rice – horror novelist; author of bestselling Interview with a Vampire series
Nora Roberts – romance novelist; first inductee into the Romance Writers of America Hall of Fame
Kay Ryan – poet and academic; Poet Laureate of the United States
Michael Ryan – poet; awarded the 1990 Lenore Marshall Poetry Prize for God Hunger
John Patrick Shanley – playwright and screenwriter; winner of the 2005 Pulitzer Prize for Drama for Doubt: A Parable
Mickey Spillane – crime novelist; author of bestselling Mike Hammer detective novels
John Kennedy Toole – novelist; posthumously awarded the 1981 Pulitzer Prize for Fiction for A Confederacy of Dunces
Michael Walsh – novelist and screenwriter; awarded a 2004 American Book Award for And All The Saints
John Wieners - poet, student of Charles Olson, associated with the Beats and the Boston School.
Roger Zelazny – fantasy and science fiction author; winner of three Nebula Awards and six Hugo Awards

Military

John Barry – Irish-born Revolutionary War Navy Captain.
Michael Corcoran – United States Army general
James Hickey – leader of Operation Red Dawn; son of Irish immigrants
Stephen W. Kearny – US Army officer, noted for action in the southwest during the Mexican–American War
Andrew Lewis – Continental Army general
Alfred Thayer Mahan – naval officer and author whose work, including Sea Power, inspired the creation of the modern United States Navy
Dennis Hart Mahan – guiding light and head of faculty at West Point for decades prior to the Civil War; influential author whose published works were the keystone for spreading engineering knowledge throughout the antebellum US; his Napoleon seminar at West Point informed Civil War strategies, North and South
George Gordon Meade – commanding general of the Army of the Potomac who led the Union forces to victory at Gettysburg in 1863
Thomas Francis Meagher – United States Army general, Fenian
Richard Montgomery – Continental Army general
Audie Murphy – most decorated combat soldier of World War II
Lt. Michael Patrick Murphy – Navy Seal, Medal of Honour
Timothy Murphy – marksman, Continental Army; parents were Irish immigrants 
Thomas Macdonough, Jr. 19th-century Irish-American naval officer
Jeremiah O'Brien – captain in Continental Navy
Joseph T. O'Callaghan – Medal of Honour
John O'Neill – United States Army general, Fenian 
John P. O'Neill – high ranking anti-terrorism expert
Molly Pitcher – Revolutionary War heroine
John Reynolds – general commanding the right wing of the Army of the Potomac who surprised Lee and committed the Union Army to battle at Gettysburg in July 1863; killed in the front lines while personally rallying troops for counterattacks during the first day of fighting
Philip Sheridan – United States Army, General of the Army, Cavalry
John Fitzgerald established the first catholic church of Virginia and Aide-De-Camp to George Washington
George Crawford Platt - Irish Immigrant, served during Civil War, Medal of Honor recipient.

Musicians

Politicians

Presidents
At least 22 presidents of the United States have some Irish ancestral origins, although the extent of this varies. For instance, President Clinton claims Irish ancestry despite there being no documentation of any of his ancestors coming from Ireland, but Kennedy on the other hand has strong documented Irish origins. Also Ronald Reagan's great-grandfather was an Irish Roman Catholic, and his mother had some Scots-Irish ancestry. James K. Polk also had Scots-Irish Ancestry. Kennedy and Joe Biden were raised as practicing Catholics.

Andrew Jackson (Scotch-Irish and English)
 7th President 1829–37: He was born in the predominantly Ulster-Scots Waxhaws area of South Carolina two years after his parents left Boneybefore, near Carrickfergus in County Antrim. A heritage centre in the village pays tribute to the legacy of 'Old Hickory', the People's President. Andrew Jackson then moved to Tennessee, where he served as Governor
James Knox Polk (Scotch-Irish)
11th President, 1845–49: His ancestors were among the first Ulster-Scots settlers, emigrating from Coleraine in 1680 to become a powerful political family in Mecklenburg County, North Carolina. He moved to Tennessee and became its governor before winning the presidency.
James Buchanan (Scotch-Irish)
15th President, 1857–61: Born in a log cabin (which has been relocated to his old school in Mercersburg, Pennsylvania), 'Old Buck' cherished his origins: "My Ulster blood is a priceless heritage". The Buchanans were originally from Deroran, near Omagh in County Tyrone where the ancestral home still stands. Buchanan also had pre-plantation Irish ancestry being a descendant of the O'Kanes from County Londonderry.   
Andrew Johnson (Irish & English)
17th President, 1865–69: His grandfather supposedly left Mounthill, near Larne in County Antrim around 1750 and settled in North Carolina he was of English ancestry. Andrew worked there as a tailor and ran a successful business in Greeneville, Tennessee, before being elected Vice-President. He became President following Abraham Lincoln's assassination. His Mother was Mary “Polly” McDonough of Irish ancestry 1782
Ulysses S. Grant (Possibly Irish, Scotch-Irish, English & Scottish)
18th President, 1869–77: The home of his maternal great-grandfather, John Simpson, at Dergenagh, County Tyrone, is the location for an exhibition on the eventful life of the victorious Civil War commander who served two terms as President. Grant visited his ancestral homeland in 1878. His grandmother was Rachel Kelley, the daughter of an Irish pioneer. Surname Kelly 
Chester A. Arthur (Scotch-Irish & English)
21st President, 1881–85: His election was the start of a quarter-century in which the White House was occupied by men of Ulster-Scots origins. His family left Dreen, near Cullybackey, County Antrim, in 1815. There is now an interpretive centre, alongside the Arthur Ancestral Home, devoted to his life and times.
Grover Cleveland (Irish, Anglo-Irish)
22nd and 24th President, 1885–89 and 1893–97: Born in New Jersey, he was the maternal grandson of merchant Abner Neal, who emigrated from County Antrim in the 1790s. He is the only president to have served non-consecutive terms. Stephen Grover Cleveland was born to Ann (née Neal) and Richard Falley Cleveland. Ann Neal was of Irish ancestry and Richard Falley Cleveland was of Anglo-Irish and English ancestry 
Benjamin Harrison (Scotch-Irish & English)
23rd President, 1889–93: His mother, Elizabeth Irwin, had Ulster-Scots roots through her two great-grandfathers, James Irwin and William McDowell. Harrison was born in Ohio and served as a brigadier general in the Union Army before embarking on a career in Indiana politics which led to the White House.
William McKinley (Scotch-Irish & English)
25th President, 1897–1901: Born in Ohio, the descendant of a farmer from Conagher, near Ballymoney, County Antrim, he was proud of his ancestry and addressed one of the national Scotch-Irish congresses held in the late 19th century. His second term as president was cut short by an assassin's bullet.
Theodore Roosevelt (Irish, Scotch-Irish, Dutch, Scotch, English & French)
26th President, 1901-09: His mother, Mittie Bulloch, had Ulster-Scots ancestors who emigrated from Glenoe, County Antrim, in May 1729. Roosevelt praised "Irish Presbyterians" as "a bold and hardy race." However, he is also the man who said: "But a hyphenated American is not an American at all. This is just as true of the man who puts "native" before the hyphen as of the man who puts German or Irish or English or French before the hyphen." 
William Howard Taft (Irish & English)
27th President 1909–13: His great-great-great-grandfather, Robert Taft, was born in 1640 in Ireland and immigrated to America during the mid 17th century. Robert Taft was from County Louth and died in Mendon, Worcester, Massachusetts.
Woodrow Wilson (Scotch-Irish)
28th President, 1913–21: Of Ulster-Scot descent on both sides of the family, his roots were very strong and dear to him. He was a grandson of a printer from Dergalt, near Strabane, County Tyrone, whose former home is open to visitors. Throughout his career, he reflected on the influence of his ancestral values on his constant quest for knowledge and fulfillment.
Warren G. Harding (Scotch-Irish & English)
29th President 1921–23
Harry S. Truman (Scotch-Irish & German)
33rd President 1945–53
John F. Kennedy (Irish)
35th President 1961–63 (ancestors from County Wexford)
Richard Nixon (Irish, Scotch-Irish, English & German)
37th President, 1969–74: The Nixon ancestors left Ulster in the mid-18th century; the Quaker Milhous family ties were with County Antrim and County Kildare and County Cork.
Jimmy Carter (Scotch-Irish & English)
39th President 1977–1981 (County Antrim)
Ronald Reagan (Irish, English & Scottish)
40th President 1981–89: He was the great-grandson, on his father's side, of Irish migrants from County Tipperary who came to America via Canada and England in the 1850s and 1870s. His mother was of Scottish and English ancestry.
George H. W. Bush (Irish and English)
41st President 1989–93: County Wexford historians have found that his now apparent ancestor, Richard de Clare, Earl of Pembroke (known as Strongbow for his arrow skills) – is remembered as a desperate, land-grabbing warlord whose calamitous foreign adventure led to the suffering of generations. Shunned by Henry II, he offered his services as a mercenary in the 12th-century invasion of Wexford in exchange for power and land. He would die from a festering ulcer in his foot, which his enemies said was the revenge of Irish saints whose shrines he had violated. The genetic line can also be traced to Dermot MacMurrough, the Gaelic king of Leinster reviled in history books as the man who sold Ireland by inviting Strongbow's invasion to save himself from a local feud.
Bill Clinton (Irish, Scotch-Irish & English)
42nd President 1993–2001: He claims Irish ancestry despite there being no documentation of any of his ancestors coming from Ireland.
George W. Bush (Irish, Scottish, Dutch, Welsh, French, German & English)
43rd President 2001–09: One of his five times great-grandfathers, William Holliday, was born in Rathfriland, County Down, about 1755, and died in Kentucky about 1811–12. One of the President's seven times great-grandfathers, William Shannon, was born somewhere in County Cork about 1730 and died in Pennsylvania in 1784.
Barack Obama (Kenyan, English & Irish)
44th President 2009–2017: His paternal ancestors came to America from Kenya and his maternal ancestors came to America from England. His ancestors lived in New England and the South and by the 1800s most were in the Midwest. His father was Kenyan and the first of his family to leave Africa. His great great grandfather, Falmouth Kearney, was born in the Irish town of Moneygall.
Joe Biden (Irish and English) 
 46th President 2021-present: Through his father, his ancestors are partly from Ireland, and his family are practicing Roman Catholics.

Science
Jim Collins – Rhodes Scholar, MacArthur genius, bioengineer and inventor
John Philip Holland – inventor of the submarine, Fenian
Charles Brian Montagu McBurney – medical pioneer, known for early reports about appendicitis
John Murphy (engineer) – invented ARCNET, the first commercial networking system
Joseph John O'Connell – electrical engineer and inventor, invented the circuit breaker, the coin return, and the "invisible wire" which was the first time more than one telephone conversation could occur on the same wire
O. Timothy O'Meara – mathematician, University of Notre Dame
Charles Townes – physicist, Nobel Prize in Physics laureate
James Watson – molecular biologist, discoverer of double helix structure DNA, laureate

Sports
Brendon Ayanbadejo – American football player
Obafemi Ayanbadejo – American football player
Laila Ali – former professional boxer
Muhammad Ali – legendary professional boxer; descended from the Abe O'Grady, Ennis, County Clare
James J. Braddock – champion boxer
Kyle Brady – American football player
Tom Brady – American football quarterback
Tom Cahill – Major League Baseball player
Mark Calaway – pro wrestler with the WWE, known as the Undertaker
Jim Calhoun – NCAA men's basketball coach
Ryan Callahan – Ice hockey player
Matt Cavanaugh – American football coach and former NFL player
John Cena – WWE professional wrestler; mother is of Irish descent
Gerry Cooney – heavyweight boxer
John Daly – professional golfer in PGA Tour
Jack Dempsey – World Heavyweight Champion 1919–1926
Pat Duff – Major League Baseball player
John Elway – Hall of Fame NFL quarterback
Whitey Ford – Hall of Fame pitcher for the NY Yankees
Jeff Hardy – ROH professional wrestler
Matt Hardy – professional wrestler
Ben Hogan – Hall of Fame PGA golfer
AJ Styles – WWE professional wrestler
Derek Jeter – five-time World Series champion shortstop for NY Yankees
Patrick Kane – Ice hockey player
Jason Kidd – NBA point guard
Marie Mahoney – All-American Girls professional baseball player
McKayla Maroney – double Olympic medalist for gymnastics in London 2012; parents of Irish descent
Dave McCloughan – American football defensive back
Kent McCloughan – American football scout, father of Scot and Kent
Scot McCloughan – American football general manager
John McEnroe – professional tennis player
Kevin McHale – NBA Hall of Famer
Johnny "Blood" McNally – American football player
Ryan Meara – NY Red Bulls goalkeeper
Shannon Moore – professional wrestler
Troy O'Leary – Boston Red Sox outfielder for six years
Kelley O'Hara – Professional Soccer player; Currently with United States Women's National Soccer Team Player and the National Women's Soccer League Utah Royals FC; FIFA Women's World Cup champion (2015) and Olympic soccer gold medalist (2012); Hermann Trophy winner 2009
Heather O'Reilly – Professional Soccer player; Former United States Women's National Soccer Team Player, Currently with Arsenal Ladies; FIFA Women's World Cup champion (2015) and Olympic soccer gold medalist (2008, 2012)
Michael Phelps
CM Punk – Father is of Irish descent
John Quinlan – pro wrestler
Ryan Max Riley – humorist and national champion skier
Freddie Roach – former boxer and current boxing trainer
Kelly Slater – professional surfer
John L. Sullivan – last bare-knuckle boxing heavyweight champion of the world; first gloved heavyweight champion of the world; first American athlete to become a national celebrity and to earn over $1 million
Mickey Ward – WBA champion boxer
Lenny Wilkens – NBA player
Vince McMahon – professional wrestling promoter and executive, American football executive, and businessman.
 Derrick Williams

Others
"The Unsinkable Molly Brown" – born Molly Tobin; Irish father
R. Nicholas Burns – diplomat, Harvard professor, columnist and lecturer; 19th Undersecretary of State for Political Affairs; 17th United States Permanent Representative to NATO; US Ambassador to Greece 1997–2001
Eileen Collins – first female commander of a Space Shuttle
George Croghan - colonial Irish American Indian trader 
Pamela Kyle Crossley – historian
 Ann Dunham – anthropologist and mother of Barack Obama
John Dunlap – printer, printed the first copies of the Declaration of Independence
Thomas Fitzpatrick -mountain man
Henry Louis Gates – professor at Harvard University
Ann Glover – hanged as a witch in Boston
Sasha Grey – pornographic actress
Dan Harrington – world poker champion
James Healy – Bishop of Portland America's first African-American bishop; born a slave according to the laws of Georgia to an Irish immigrant and his African wife; first graduate and valedictorian of Holy Cross College in Massachusetts
Michael Healy – Captain of the Revenue Cutter Bear; defender of Alaska's Native Americans; inspiration for Jack London's The Sea Wolf; prominent figure in James Michener's Alaska; younger brother of James and Patrick Healy
Patrick Healy – President of Georgetown University, considered its second founder; brother of James Healy; first African-American president of an American university; priest in the Society of Jesus (the Jesuits)
James Hoban – architect of the White House
Mary Jemison – frontierswoman; born on board ship as her parents were emigrating to the US
Jacqueline Kennedy Onassis – former First Lady; her mother, Janet Lee Bouvier, is of mostly Irish descent
Martin Luther King Jr. – African-American civil rights leader, activist, and pastor; his paternal line traces directly back to Ireland
Bat Masterson – lawman
Christa McAuliffe – teacher and astronaut who was killed in the 1986 Space Shuttle Challenger disaster
Dwight C. Miner – historian and professor
Paul Charles Morphy (1837–1884) – chess player
Michael Patrick Mulroy – Deputy Assistant Secretary of Defense for Jim Mattis, CIA officer, U.S. Marine, documentary film maker and Irish American.
Michael Patrick Murphy – U.S. Navy SEAL, Medal of Honor recipient, U.S. Navy Ship named in his honor the USS Michael Murphy
Richard T. Nolan – writer, Episcopal Church canon, retired philosophy and religion professor
Frank Sheeran – WWII army vet, hitman, topic of 2019 movie The Irishman
Ellen Ewing Sherman – stepsister and wife of William Tecumseh Sherman
David Steele – Presbyterian minister
Kathleen Willey – a major figure in the Paula Jones and Monica Lewinsky scandals involving President Bill Clinton; mother is of Irish descent
Indigo Vinson - a person with 20% Irish heritage

See also
Knights of Equity
American Irish Historical Society

Footnotes

References

Further reading
 
 Byrne, James Patrick, Philip Coleman, and Jason Francis King, eds. Ireland and the Americas: culture, politics, and history: a multidisciplinary encyclopedia (3 vol. ABC-CLIO, 2008)
 Delaney, John J. Dictionary of American Catholic biography (Doubleday, 1984), 625pp; 1500 short biographies, about half Irish
 Glazier, Michael, ed. The encyclopedia of the Irish in America (University of Notre Dame Press, 1999)

External links
 The Irish-born signatories of the American Declaration of Independence
 The American Irish Historical Society

 
Americans
American
Irish